Elisabeth Marij (Lisa) Westerveld (born 16 November 1981) is a Dutch politician serving as a member of GroenLinks in the House of Representatives of the Netherlands since 2017. Between 2014 and 2017 she was a member of the municipality council of Nijmegen.

Early life and career 
Westerveld was born and raised in Aalten. She is from a family that were loyal voters of the Christian Union. She attended Christelijk College Schaersvoorde when she was a teenager.

She moved to Nijmegen for university, where she studied philosophy at the Radboud University Nijmegen. From 2007 until 2009 she was chairwoman of the National Student Union (LSVb). In 2010 she graduated with a master's degree in political philosophy.

After completing her studies she started to work as a spokesperson and political lobbyist for the General Education Union.

Politics 
She was first a member of the SP. She became a member of Groenlinks after she stopped at the National student union in 2009.

For the 2012 Dutch general election she was placed 22nd on the party list and therefore wasn't able to get elected as Groenlinks only obtained four seats. In 2014 she got elected into the municipality council of Nijmegen, where she was placed second on the party list. She got the most votes of women candidates in Nijmegen in that election.

In 2017 Groenlinks won 14 seats in the House of Representatives. Westerveld was placed 14th on the party list which would initially be enough to be get a seat, but because an candidate placed 19th on the party list was elected with enough preference votes she almost lost the seat. Westerveld garnered 18.000 preference votes which was eventually enough to get a seat in the House of Representatives. In 2021 she was reelected based on preferences votes again. Groenlinks won 8 seats but Westerveld was placed 10th on the party list, she got 33,172 preference votes was passed the threshold to get a seat.

Electoral history

References 

1981 births
Living people
21st-century Dutch politicians
21st-century Dutch women politicians
GroenLinks politicians
Members of the House of Representatives (Netherlands)
20th-century Dutch women